Chowan University is a private Baptist university in Murfreesboro, North Carolina. It is affiliated with the Baptist State Convention of North Carolina (Southern Baptist Convention). It is the second-oldest Baptist school in North Carolina.  The university offers associate, bachelor's, and master's degrees in 70 academic disciplines and is accredited by the Southern Association of Colleges and Schools. The university enrolls about 1,000 students.

History 

Chowan was founded by Godwin Cotton Moore in 1848 as Chowan Baptist Female Institute, a four-year women's college.  It traces its roots to the Hertford Academy. The McDowell Columns building, which houses the administrative offices of the college, was constructed in 1851. Between 1850 and 1867, the school changed names to the Chowan Female Collegiate Institute, then switched back to the Chowan Baptist Female Institute.

The school was renamed Chowan College in 1910 when it began awarding baccalaureate degrees, and began admitting male students in 1931.  Financial strain from the effects of the Great Depression forced the school to become a two-year institution in 1937.  In 1992, the college returned to four-year status when it admitted a junior class.  The college's board of trustees elected to officially change the name to Chowan University on April 6, 2006, and the change in status took place on September 1, 2006.

The school takes its name from the Chowanoke tribe of indigenous people who previously inhabited the land on which Murfreesboro and Chowan University stand.

Academics 
Chowan offers over 70 academic programs, an honors college, study abroad, research opportunities, and internships. An academic assistance program and tutoring center provide academic assistance for the entire student population. Student tutors and the academic assistance team work one-on-one with students.

Accreditation 
It is affiliated with the Baptist State Convention of North Carolina (Southern Baptist Convention).

Athletics 

Chowan changed affiliation to the National Collegiate Athletic Association's (NCAA) Division II, primary competing in Conference Carolinas, and was formerly also a member of the National Christian College Athletic Association.  Chowan previously competed in the USA South Athletic Conference of the National Collegiate Athletic Association's Division III and the Central Intercollegiate Athletic Association of the National Collegiate Athletic Association's Division II.  The school's original mascot, adopted in the 1940s, was the Braves but was changed in 2006 to the Hawks due to NCAA policy on Native American mascots.

Chowan University has the following athletic teams: Women's Soccer, Men's Soccer, Football, Volleyball, Men's and Women's Cross Country, Men's Basketball, Women's Basketball, Softball, Baseball, Men's and Women's Golf, Men's and Women's Tennis, Men's and Women's Lacrosse, Women's Bowling, Women's Acrobatic and Tumbling, Men's and Women's Swimming, co-ed Esports and Cheerleading.

Notable alumni

Elected officials 
 Howard Jacque Hunter III, member of the North Carolina General Assembly 
 Timothy Douglas Hugo, American businessman, military veteran, and Republican politician in the Commonwealth of Virginia
 Donald Strehle Whitehead, 23rd and 28th lieutenant governor of Idaho

Athletes 
 Fred Banks, professional football player
 Robert Brown, professional football player
 David Green, professional football player
 Jerry Holmes, professional football player
 George Koonce, professional football player
 Nate McMillan, professional basketball player and coach
 Mark Royals, professional football player
 Jody Schulz, professional football player
 Curtis Whitley, professional football player

Other notable former students 
 Khalid Sheikh Mohammed, confessed planner of the September 11 attacks.  Mohammed transferred to NC A&T after only one semester.

References

External links 
 
 Chowan University Yearbooks and Student Newspapers at the North Carolina Digital Heritage Center

 
Education in Hertford County, North Carolina
Educational institutions established in 1848
Female seminaries in the United States
Former women's universities and colleges in the United States
Chowan
Universities and colleges accredited by the Southern Association of Colleges and Schools
Private universities and colleges in North Carolina
Liberal arts colleges in North Carolina
1848 establishments in North Carolina